Tyler O'Neil Cyr (born May 5, 1993) is an American professional baseball pitcher in the Los Angeles Dodgers organization. He made his Major League Baseball (MLB) debut in 2022 with the Philadelphia Phillies and has also played in MLB for the Oakland Athletics.

Career

San Francisco Giants
Cyr attended John F. Kennedy High School in Fremont, California. He enrolled at Skyline College, where he played college baseball as a pitcher for one year, before he transferred to Embry-Riddle Aeronautical University. 

The San Francisco Giants selected Cyr in the 10th round of the 2015 Major League Baseball draft. He made his professional debut with the Arizona League Giants and was promoted to the Single-A Augusta GreenJackets during the season. In 2016, Cyr split the year between Augusta and the High-A San Jose Giants, registering a combined 5-4 record and 2.32 ERA with 89 strikeouts in 73.2 innings pitched across 39 appearances. In 2017, Cyr played for the Double-A Richmond Flying Squirrels, posting a 5-2 record and 2.19 ERA with 57 strikeouts in 49.1 innings of work. He worked primarily as the team’s closer, collecting 18 saves in 47 games. After the season, he played in the Arizona Fall League and was selected to play in the Fall Stars Game.

Cyr only pitched in 8 games in 2018, all for Double-A Richmond, due to injury. In 2019, he spent the year with Richmond, also appearing in one game for the Triple-A Sacramento River Cats at the end of the season. In 37 games for the Flying Squirrels, Cyr posted a 2.05 ERA with 57 strikeouts and 5 saves in 48.1 innings pitched. Cyr did not play in a game in 2020 due to the cancellation of the minor league season because of the COVID-19 pandemic.

Cyr spent the 2021 campaign with Triple-A Sacramento. In 32 appearances (including two starts), he pitched to a 3-0 record and 4.91 ERA with 49 strikeouts in 36.2 innings of work. He elected free agency following the season on November 7, 2021.

Philadelphia Phillies
On December 10, 2021, Cyr signed a minor league contract with the Philadelphia Phillies organization. He was assigned to the Triple-A Lehigh Valley IronPigs to begin the 2022 season. He appeared in 35 games for Lehigh, pitching to a 2-3 record and 2.50 ERA with 37 strikeouts and 6 saves in 36.0 innings of work.

The Phillies promoted Cyr to the major leagues for the first time on August 21, 2022. He made his major league debut that day, allowing a home run to New York Mets outfielder Brandon Nimmo. He was designated for assignment the next day.

Oakland Athletics
On August 24, 2022, Cyr was claimed off waivers by the Oakland Athletics and was assigned to the Triple-A Las Vegas Aviators. Cyr made 11 appearances for Oakland down the stretch, collecting his first major league win as he posted a 2.08 ERA with 16 strikeouts in 13.0 innings pitched.

On January 13, 2023, Cyr was designated for assignment by Oakland. He was released on January 17.

Los Angeles Dodgers
On January 21, 2023, Cyr signed a minor league contract with the Los Angeles Dodgers organization.

References

External links

Living people
1993 births
People from Fremont, California
Baseball players from California
Major League Baseball pitchers
Philadelphia Phillies players
Oakland Athletics players
Embry–Riddle Eagles baseball players
Arizona League Giants players
Augusta GreenJackets players
San Jose Giants players
Richmond Flying Squirrels players
Scottsdale Scorpions players
Sacramento River Cats players
Lehigh Valley IronPigs players
Gigantes del Cibao players
Las Vegas Aviators players